Gillis Lundgren (26 August 1929 – 25 February 2016) was a Swedish furniture designer and the fourth employee of IKEA. He designed the Billy bookcase of which over 60 million have been produced.

References

1929 births
2016 deaths
People from Lund
IKEA people
Swedish furniture designers